Conophyma is the type genus of grasshoppers of  the subfamily Conophyminae and tribe Conophymini.  Species are recorded from central Asia.

Species
The Orthoptera Species File lists:

 Conophyma alajense Mistshenko, 1951
 Conophyma almasyi (Kuthy, 1905)
 Conophyma amicus Li & Ti, 1995
 Conophyma argutum Mistshenko, 1950
 Conophyma armatum Mistshenko, 1950
 Conophyma bactrianum Mistshenko, 1950
 Conophyma badium Mistshenko, 1950
 Conophyma baludzhianum Mistshenko, 1946
 Conophyma berezhkovi Bey-Bienko, 1948
 Conophyma beybienkoi Mistshenko, 1937
 Conophyma bogojavlenskii Tarbinsky, 1926
 Conophyma boldyrevi Bey-Bienko, 1948
 Conophyma cercatum (Ramme, 1939)
 Conophyma comatum Mistshenko, 1951
 Conophyma comtulum Mistshenko, 1950
 Conophyma corallipes (Ramme, 1939)
 Conophyma darvazicum Mistshenko, 1950
 Conophyma dirshi Bey-Bienko, 1948
 Conophyma dumale Mistshenko, 1950
 Conophyma egregium Mistshenko, 1950
 Conophyma excellens Mistshenko, 1950
 Conophyma formosum Mistshenko, 1951
 Conophyma fuscum Mistshenko, 1950
 Conophyma geminum Mistshenko, 1950
 Conophyma ghilarovi Chernyakhovskij, 1985
 Conophyma ghilarovianum Myrzaliev, 1988
 Conophyma hejinensis Zhang, Xu & Zhang, 2015
 Conophyma herbaceum Mistshenko, 1951
 Conophyma ikonnikovi Uvarov, 1925
 Conophyma iliense Mistshenko, 1951
 Conophyma indicum Mistshenko, 1950
 Conophyma jacobsoni Uvarov, 1925
 Conophyma jakovlevi Bey-Bienko, 1936
 Conophyma kashmiricum Mistshenko, 1950
 Conophyma kusnezovi Umnov, 1931
 Conophyma latifrons Naumovich, 1986
 Conophyma laudanense Mistshenko, 1950
 Conophyma leve Mistshenko, 1951
 Conophyma lobulatum Mistshenko, 1950
 Conophyma maracandicum Mistshenko, 1950
 Conophyma mirabile Mistshenko, 1950
 Conophyma miramae Uvarov, 1925
 Conophyma mistshenkoi Protsenko, 1951
 Conophyma mitchelli Uvarov, 1921
 Conophyma montanum Chernyakhovskij, 1985
 Conophyma nanum Mistshenko, 1951
 Conophyma narzikulovi Cejchan, 1961
 Conophyma nazarovae Pokivailov & Khayrov, 2020
 Conophyma nigrescens Mistshenko, 1950
 Conophyma nigrifemora Zhang, Xu & Zhang, 2015
 Conophyma nigripes Naumovich, 1986
 Conophyma nitens Mistshenko, 1951
 Conophyma oliva Huang, 2006
 Conophyma olsufjevi Mistshenko, 1937
 Conophyma pavlovskii Tarbinsky, 1955
 Conophyma pazukii Mirzayans, 1991
 Conophyma petrosum Mistshenko, 1950
 Conophyma plotnikovi Uvarov, 1927
 Conophyma poimazaricum Sergeev & Pokivajlov, 1997
 Conophyma prasinum Mistshenko, 1950
 Conophyma pravdini Stolyarov, 1968
 Conophyma predtetshenskyi Mistshenko, 1937
 Conophyma przewalskii Bey-Bienko, 1949
 Conophyma pylnovi Uvarov, 1925
 Conophyma reinigi (Ramme, 1930)
 Conophyma remaudieri Descamps & Donskoff, 1965
 Conophyma roberti Pfadt, 1987
 Conophyma rufitibia Li & Ti, 1995
 Conophyma saxatile Mistshenko, 1950
 Conophyma semenovi Zubovski, 1898 - type species (C. semenovi semenovi)
 Conophyma septuosum Mistshenko, 1950
 Conophyma serafimi Myrzaliev, 1988
 Conophyma shamonini Shumakov, 1963
 Conophyma sharafii Pfadt, 1987
 Conophyma shumakovi Naumovich, 1986
 Conophyma simile Zubovski, 1899
 Conophyma sogdianum Mistshenko, 1950
 Conophyma sokolovi Zubovski, 1899
 Conophyma speciosum Mistshenko, 1951
 Conophyma spectabile Sergeev, 1984
 Conophyma splendidum Mistshenko, 1950
 Conophyma stebaevi Sergeev, 1986
 Conophyma susinganicum Mistshenko, 1951
 Conophyma tarbinskyi Miram, 1931
 Conophyma transiliense Naumovich, 1978
 Conophyma tumidum Mistshenko, 1950
 Conophyma turcomanum Mistshenko, 1950
 Conophyma turkestanicum Sergeev, 1984
 Conophyma umnovi Bey-Bienko, 1948
 Conophyma uvarovi Semenov, 1915
 Conophyma validum Mistshenko, 1950
 Conophyma vavilovi Bey-Bienko, 1963
 Conophyma virgatum Mistshenko, 1951
 Conophyma weberi Zubovski, 1899
 Conophyma xerophilum Mistshenko, 1951
 Conophyma xiai Zhang, Xu & Zhang, 2015
 Conophyma xinjiangensis Huang, 1982
 Conophyma zachvatkini Pravdin, 1970
 Conophyma zhaosuensis Huang, 1982
 Conophyma zimini Bey-Bienko, 1948
 Conophyma zubovskyi Uvarov, 1925

References

External Links 
 Image of C. sokolovi by Montarano Nature Photography.
 
 

Caelifera genera
Dericorythidae